Alex Bollaert (born 10 January 1930, date of death unknown) was a Belgian boxer. He competed in the men's flyweight event at the 1948 Summer Olympics.

References

1930 births
Year of death missing
Belgian male boxers
Olympic boxers of Belgium
Boxers at the 1948 Summer Olympics
Sportspeople from Antwerp
Flyweight boxers